Leroy Kwadwo (born 15 August 1996) is a German professional footballer who plays as a defender for MSV Duisburg.

Early and personal life
Kwadwo was born in Herten, North Rhine-Westphalia, Germany. His father Osam is from Ghana but emigrated to Germany in the 1980s in order to study, and played in the then third-tier Oberliga Westfalen.

Career

Early career
Kwadwo started playing youth football for SG Wattenscheid at the age of 6, and later played youth football for Rot-Weiss Essen, Westfalia Herne and TSG Sprockhövel. His scored once in three games for Sprockhövel in the 2014–15 Oberliga Westfalen, and twice in twenty-seven games in the 2015–16 Oberliga Westfalen.

Kwadwo joined Rot-Weiss Essen on a two-year contract in summer 2016. However, he played just once in the Regionalliga West before signing for Schalke 04 II in January 2017 on a contract until 2018, where he failed to make an appearance.

Fortuna Düsseldorf II
On 4 July 2017, Kwadwo signed for Fortuna Düsseldorf II following a trial spell with the club. He played 20 times in the 2017–18 season and 18 times in the 2018–19 season.

Würzburger Kickers
In June 2019, it was announced that Kwadwo had joined Würzburger Kickers on a one-year contract with the option of a further season. Kwadwo made his professional debut in the 3. Liga for Würzburger Kickers on 20 July 2019, starting against Bayern Munich II before being substituted out in the 83rd minute for Lion Schweers, with the home match finishing as a 3–1 win. He scored his first goal in professional football in the reverse fixture with a late equaliser in a 1–1 draw with Bayern Munich II on 22 December 2019. Towards the end of Würzburg's 3. Liga match away to Preußen Münster on 14 February 2020, 'monkey noises' was directed at Kwadwo from a home spectator, causing the game to be briefly paused while they were ejected from the ground by the stewards. In response, supporters of both sides chanted "Nazis raus", which translates to "Nazis out". He played 25 times in the league for Würzburger Kickers across the 2019–20 season, scoring one goal. In July 2020, his contract with the club was extended. He played 4 times for the club in the 2020–21 season.

Dynamo Dresden
On 18 January 2021, Kwadwo joined Dynamo Dresden on a contract until the end of the season.

MSV Duisburg
After a half year at Dresden, he joined MSV Duisburg in the summer of 2021.

Career statistics

References

External links
 Profile at DFB.de
 Profile at kicker.de

1996 births
Living people
People from Herten
Sportspeople from Münster (region)
German footballers
Ghanaian footballers
German sportspeople of Ghanaian descent
Association football central defenders
Footballers from North Rhine-Westphalia
TSG Sprockhövel players
Rot-Weiss Essen players
FC Schalke 04 II players
Fortuna Düsseldorf II players
Würzburger Kickers players
Dynamo Dresden players
MSV Duisburg players
2. Bundesliga players
3. Liga players
Regionalliga players
Oberliga (football) players